Russellville-Logan County Airport  is a public use airport located four nautical miles (5 mi, 7 km) southeast of the central business district of Russellville, a city in Logan County, Kentucky, United States. Owned by the City County Airport Board, it is included in the National Plan of Integrated Airport Systems for 2011–2015, which categorized it as a general aviation facility.

Facilities and aircraft
Russellville-Logan County Airport covers an area of 68 acres (28 ha) at an elevation of 689 feet (210 m) above mean sea level. It has one runway designated 6/24 with an asphalt surface measuring 4,000 by 75 feet (1,219 x 23 m).

For the 12-month period ending August 30, 2012, the airport had 17,743 aircraft operations, an average of 48 per day: 76% general aviation, 20% military, and 4% air taxi. At that time there were 13 single-engine aircraft based at this airport.

See also
 List of airports in Kentucky

References

External links
 Russellville-Logan County Airport, official site
 Aerial image as of April 1998 from USGS The National Map
 
 

Airports in Kentucky
Buildings and structures in Logan County, Kentucky
Transportation in Logan County, Kentucky